The 2021–22 NCAA football bowl games were a series of college football games scheduled to complete the 2021 NCAA Division I FBS football season. The main games concluded with the 2022 College Football Playoff National Championship played on January 10, 2022, while the all-star portion of the schedule concluded February 19, 2022.

Schedule
The schedule for the 2021–22 bowl games is below. All times are EST (UTC−5). Note that Division II bowls and Division III bowls are not included here. The bowl schedule was released on May 27, 2021.

College Football Playoff and National Championship Game
The College Football Playoff system is used to determine a national championship of Division I FBS college football. A 13-member committee of experts ranked the top 25 teams in the nation after each of the last seven weeks of the regular season. The top four teams in the final ranking were then seeded in a single-elimination semifinal round, with the winners advancing to the National Championship game.

The semifinal games for the 2021 season were the Cotton Bowl Classic and the Orange Bowl. Both were played December 31, 2021, as part of a yearly rotation of three pairs of two bowls, commonly referred to as the New Year's Six bowl games. The winners advanced to the 2022 College Football Playoff National Championship on January 10, 2022.

Each of the games in the following table was televised by ESPN.

Non CFP bowl games

Bowl changes
Two bowls, which had originally planned to debut during the 2020–21 bowl season but were postponed due to the COVID-19 pandemic, planned to make their debuts during the 2021–22 bowl season; the Fenway Bowl (Boston, Massachusetts) and the LA Bowl (Inglewood, California). The LA Bowl made its debut, while the Fenway Bowl was again canceled due to COVID-19 issues.

The Montgomery Bowl, played in December 2020 as a one-off substitute for the Fenway Bowl, did not return. The San Francisco Bowl (formerly the Redbox Bowl) was canceled for a second straight season when organizers could not come to terms with all parties involved with the game.

On December 2, 2021, the NCAA approved a 42nd bowl game, later named the Frisco Football Classic, in order to accommodate all 84 bowl-eligible teams.

On December 22, Texas A&M withdrew from the Gator Bowl, citing a breakout of positive COVID-19 cases and season-ending injuries limiting them to too few players. Rutgers was subsequently announced as a replacement team.

On December 23, Hawaii withdrew from the Hawaii Bowl, similarly citing season-ending injuries, transfers, and COVID-19 cases within the program, and the game was ultimately cancelled.

On December 26, Boston College withdrew from the Military Bowl and Virginia withdrew from the Fenway Bowl due to COVID-19 cases; both games were canceled.

On December 26, the Miami (FL) Hurricanes announced that they would not be able to play in the Sun Bowl due to COVID-19 issues; organizers stated that they would try to secure a replacement team to face the Washington State Cougars.

On December 27, the Boise State Broncos withdrew from the Arizona Bowl due to COVID-19 issues; organizers stated that they would attempt to secure a replacement team. Later in the day, the Arizona Bowl was canceled, and the bowl's remaining team, the Central Michigan Chippewas, was named as the replacement team for the Sun Bowl.

On December 28, the Holiday Bowl was called off hours before game time, due to COVID-19 issues within the UCLA Bruins program, and officially canceled the next morning, after organizers could not secure a replacement team to face the NC State Wolfpack.

Bowl schedule / results
In the below table, affiliations for confirmed teams reflect their actual conferences, and rankings are per the final CFP rankings that were released on December 5.

Source:

FCS bowl game
The Football Championship Subdivision (FCS) has one bowl game. The FCS also has a postseason bracket tournament that culminates in the 2022 NCAA Division I Football Championship Game.

All-star games
Each of these games features college seniors, or players whose college football eligibility is ending, who are individually invited by game organizers. These games are scheduled to follow the team-competitive bowls, to allow players selected from bowl teams to participate. The all-star games may include some players from non-FBS programs.

A new all-star game, the HBCU Legacy Bowl, was announced in March 2021, and concluded the overall college football post-season on February 19, 2022. All times are EST.

Team selections

CFP top 25 standings and bowl games

On December 5, 2021, the College Football Playoff (CFP) selection committee announced its final team rankings for the year. This was the eighth year of the CFP era. Cincinnati became the first team from the Group of Five conferences to reach the playoffs. Michigan became the first team to make the playoffs after starting the season unranked in the AP Poll.

Conference champions' bowl games
Ranks are per the final CFP rankings, released on December 5, with win–loss records at that time. One bowl will feature a matchup of conference champions – the Cotton Bowl. Champions of the Power Five conferences were assured of a spot in a New Year's Six bowl game.

Bowl-eligible teams 
Generally, a team must have at least six wins to be considered bowl eligible, with at least five of those wins being against FBS opponents. The College Football Playoff semi-final games are determined based on the top four seeds in the playoff committee's final rankings. The remainder of the bowl eligible teams are selected by each respective bowl based on conference tie-ins, order of selection, match-up considerations, and other factors.

ACC (10): Boston College, Clemson, Louisville, Miami (FL), NC State, North Carolina, Pittsburgh, Virginia, Virginia Tech, Wake Forest
American (7): Cincinnati, East Carolina, Houston, Memphis, SMU, Tulsa, UCF
Big Ten (9): Iowa, Maryland, Michigan, Michigan State, Minnesota, Ohio State, Penn State, Purdue, Wisconsin
Big 12 (7): Baylor, Iowa State, Kansas State, Oklahoma, Oklahoma State, Texas Tech, West Virginia
C-USA (8): Marshall, Middle Tennessee, North Texas, Old Dominion, UAB, UTEP, UTSA, Western Kentucky
MAC (8): Ball State, Central Michigan, Eastern Michigan, Kent State, Miami (OH), Northern Illinois, Toledo, Western Michigan
Mountain West (8): Air Force, Boise State, Fresno State, Hawaii, Nevada, San Diego State, Utah State, Wyoming
Pac-12 (6): Arizona State, Oregon, Oregon State, UCLA, Utah, Washington State
SEC (13): Alabama, Arkansas, Auburn, Florida, Georgia, Kentucky, LSU, Mississippi State, Missouri, Ole Miss,  South Carolina, Tennessee, Texas A&M
Sun Belt (4): Appalachian State, Coastal Carolina, Georgia State, Louisiana
Independent (4): Army, BYU, Liberty, Notre Dame

Number of bowl berths available: 84Number of bowl-eligible teams: 84

Bowl-ineligible teams 
ACC (4): Duke, Florida State, Georgia Tech, Syracuse
American (4): Navy, South Florida, Temple, Tulane
Big Ten (5):  Illinois, Indiana, Nebraska, Northwestern, Rutgers
Big 12 (3): Kansas, TCU, Texas
C-USA (6): Charlotte, FIU, Florida Atlantic, Louisiana Tech, Rice, Southern Miss
MAC (4): Akron, Bowling Green, Buffalo, Ohio
Mountain West (4): Colorado State,  New Mexico, San Jose State, UNLV
Pac-12 (6):  Arizona, California, Colorado, Stanford, USC, Washington
SEC (1): Vanderbilt
Sun Belt (6): Arkansas State, Georgia Southern, Louisiana–Monroe, South Alabama, Texas State, Troy
Independent (3): New Mexico State, UConn, UMass

Number of bowl-ineligible teams: 46

 Rutgers had the highest Academic Progress Rate (APR) of five-win teams. The NCAA announced on December 23 that Rutgers was the first eligible team, under APR regulations, to replace Texas A&M in the Gator Bowl. Rutgers accepted the bid.

Venues
A total of thirty-seven venues were utilized, with seven of them in particular for the CFP National Championship and New Year's Six (NY6). The number of venues increased from twenty, primarily due to the relaxation of the COVID-19 pandemic. Prior to the COVID-19 pandemic, the number of venues for bowl games typically was around forty. Prestige and capacity of venues usually increases as the schedule progresses towards to NY6 bowls and the national championship, in large part due to scheduling Top 25 teams late into the bowl games' time frame, while bowl games before Christmas Day typically involve schools in Group of Five conferences. Televising at the venues of bowl games is largely run by ESPN and joint networks (ABC & ESPN2), with only three bowl games run by a non-affiliated network (Holiday Bowl on Fox, Sun Bowl on CBS and Arizona Bowl on Barstool Sports). With the exception of the Bahamas Bowl in The Bahamas, all bowls were played within the United States.

CFP bowls

The College Football Playoff committee elected to continue with the six venues for this postseason—including two as the semifinals for the 2022 College Football Playoff National Championship―as outlined below:

 AT&T Stadium in Arlington: Venue for the 2021 Cotton Bowl Classic that featured one of the semi-final pairings.
 State Farm Stadium in Glendale: Venue for the 2022 Fiesta Bowl that featured two of the four highest non-Top 4 and non-NY6 bid conference affiliated.
 Mercedes-Benz Stadium in Atlanta: Venue for the 2021 Peach Bowl that featured two of the four highest non-Top 4 and non-NY6 bid conference affiliated.
 Hard Rock Stadium in Miami Gardens: Venue for the 2021 Orange Bowl that featured one of the semi-final pairings.
 Rose Bowl in Pasadena: Venue for the 2022 Rose Bowl that featured the highest non-top 4 conference finishers from the Big Ten and Pac-12.
 Caesars Superdome in New Orleans: Venue for the 2022 Sugar Bowl that featured the highest non-top 4 conference finishers from the SEC and Big 12.

The National Championship was played at Lucas Oil Stadium in Indianapolis, marking the first time that a state in the U.S. midwest hosted the national championship game in the CFP era.

Television ratings
All times Eastern.
CFP Rankings.

Most watched non-CFP bowl games

New Year Six and College Football Playoff semifinal games

Notes

References

Further reading

External links
 College Football Playoff website